Powersville is a rural community in Floyd County, Iowa, United States.

History
Powersville's population was 50 in 1925.

References 

Unincorporated communities in Floyd County, Iowa
Unincorporated communities in Iowa